Allah Rakha (1932 – 2015), also referred to by the title Ustad, was a Pakistani sarangi player and often performed with music groups on Pakistan Television. Among the music instruments of the Indian sub-continent, sarangi is a complex and difficult to play stringed instrument. According to Allah Rakha's obituary in The News International newspaper, "It should not be forgotten that to play the sarangi well is a feat in itself; it requires decades of dedicated application."

Early life and education
Allah Rakha was born in Muzaffar, a village in Sialkot District of Punjab, in 1932. During early childhood, his family moved to Amritsar, British India where he was raised. He acquired his initial education in classical music and sarangi playing from his father, Ustad Lal Din. Later, he became the student of three renowned sarangi players, Ustad Ahmadi Khan (died in Delhi in 1945), Ustad Alladiya Khan (1855 – 1946), and Ustad Nathu Khan (1920 – 1971) of Pakistan Television, Karachi Center.

Career
His talent was first appreciated in his early teenage years, when he performed in a contest at a local wedding, and was lauded for his performance of Raga Desi.

After 1947 partition, Allah Rakha migrated to Pakistan, and settled temporarily in Karachi, where he also remembers to have had the honor of playing live for Mohammad Ali Jinnah. It was also here that he met Ustad Bade Ghulam Ali Khan and honed his skills as a sarangi accompanist to performing vocalist musicians on Radio and TV.

He moved to Lahore in 1948, and for almost two decades, he worked at the Radio Pakistan Lahore Station, and also in the Pakistani film industry as a recording artist. In Lahore, his knowledge of music was further broadened during his association with Ustad Sardar Khan (vocalist), son of Umrao Khan, and grandson of Tanras Khan.

The he moved to Rawalpindi in 1968 and became a regular employee of Radio Pakistan, Rawalpindi, where he served till his retirement in 1992. It should be added here that sarangi is made with horse hair and goatskin, brass and wood. It also takes long periods of one's life to learn how to play it well. Allah Rakha died in 2015.

He had also traveled abroad several times and performed in Afghanistan, Sri Lanka, India, China, Dubai, France, Hungary, Italy, the United Kingdom, and Germany.
In 1997, he performed as a soloist with the Belgian Rajhans Orchestra in a concert tour starting in Islamabad and later performing in Lahore and Karachi, directed by composer-conductor Hans Vermeersch.

Awards and recognition
Pride of Performance Award by the President of Pakistan for his lifelong devotion to classical music in 1995.

References

1932 births
2015 deaths
Hindustani instrumentalists
Pakistani musicians
People from Sialkot
Sarangi players
Recipients of the Pride of Performance